The 1927 Kilkenny Senior Hurling Championship was the 33rd staging of the Kilkenny Senior Hurling Championship since its establishment by the Kilkenny County Board.

It took four games, including three replays, to decide the title. On 22 September 1928, Mooncoin won the championship after a 2-04 to 2-02 defeat of James Stephens in the final. It was their seventh championship title overall and their first title since 1916.

Results

Final

References

Kilkenny Senior Hurling Championship
Kilkenny Senior Hurling Championship